Kondul Island is a small island of the Nicobar Islands in India.

History
It was hit by the 2004 tsunami.
After the tsunami the surviving population moved to Great Nicobar.
at 2015 2 elders have returned to the island and they renovated the jetty. 
Poachers from Myanmar are doing illegal fishing around the island regularly.

Geography

Climate
It has a Tropical rainforest climate as even the driest months have rainfall greater than 60mm. It is one of the very few places that witness a rainforest climate in India.

Administration
The island belongs to the township of Great Nicobar of Little Nicobar Taluk.

Demographics
Mayaiya village is inhabited and has a radio antenna.

Image gallery

References 

Islands of the Andaman and Nicobar Islands
Cities and towns in Nicobar district
Nicobar district
Islands of India
Populated places in India
Islands of the Bay of Bengal